Ralph Anthony Thicknesse (1800 – 22 August 1854) was a British Whig politician.

Thicknesse was first elected Whig MP for Wigan at the 1847 general election and held the seat until his death in 1854.

References

External links
 

Whig (British political party) MPs for English constituencies
UK MPs 1847–1852
UK MPs 1852–1857
1800 births
1854 deaths
Members of the Parliament of the United Kingdom for Wigan